The National Salvation Movement (Movimiento de Salvación Nacional) is a conservative political party in Colombia, founded by Alvaro Gómez Hurtado in 1990. At the legislative elections held on 10 March 2002, the party, as one of the many small parties, won parliamentary representation. In the simultaneous legislative elections of 2006, the party won 1 out of 166 Deputies and no senators, after which the party was disbanded.

After being inactive for 15 years, the party was relaunched in 2021 by Enrique Gómez Martínez, who was its presidential candidate in the 2022 Colombian presidential election.

References 

Conservative parties in Colombia